Princess Louise Juliane of East Frisia (16 November 1657 in Aurich – 30 October 1715 in Hamburg) was the eldest daughter of Prince Enno Louis of East Frisia and his second wife Justine Sophie of Barby.

After her father's death in 1660, she lived with her mother and her sister Sophia Wilhelmina at Berum Castle near Aurich. There were persistent inheritance disputes with their uncle George Christian and, after his death, with his widow, Christine Charlotte of Württemberg, who ruled East Frisia as regent for her underage son. The dispute was settled with a compromise in 1695.

After Juliana Louise's mother died in 1677, she was penniless and moved in with her guardian Rudolph Augustus in Wolfenbüttel. After Rudolph Augustus died in 1686, she moved in with her relative John Adolphus in Plön. In 1698, she moved to Hamburg, where she lived in a house at the Jungfernstieg. She also owned a country house at Ottensen. In 1700, she married the Reverend Joachim Morgenweck, a preacher at the orphanage of the Church of Mary Magdalene. The marriage took place secretly, because a relationship between a noblewoman and a pastor was generally regarded as scandalous in 1700. They lived apart and did not cause a stir.

Juliana Louise died in October 1715 probably of the plague (disease).  She bequeathed a sum of 3000 marks to Mary Magdalene Church, which should be used for the maintenance of her grave.  She bequeathed to Morgenweck the right to live in the house at Ottensen for the rest of his life.  A cousin challenged the will, holding up the payment of the 3000 marks.  The graveyard did not release the grave until it had been paid for.  Her tombstone stood for 18 months in the hallway of the apartment on Jungfernstieg, until she could finally be buried in March 1717.

The Church of Mary Magdalene was demolished in 1807.  Juliana Louise's tomb was moved to one the cemeteries outside Dammtor and she was reburied there.  When this cemetery was closed, she was reburied at the Ohlsdorf Cemetery and her tomb was again moved.  It is one of the oldest tombstones on the new cemetery.  It was renovated in 2010.  Originally, her grave had an inscription This grave is not to be opened as long as the wind blows and the cokc crows.  Today, the inscription reads This grave is never to be opened.

References 
 Otto Benecke: Die Prinzessin von Ostfriesland, in: Hamburgische Geschichten und Denkwürdigkeiten, Perthes-Besser & Mauke, Hamburg, 1856, p. 250-279; auch als Online
 Franklin Kopitzsch and Dirk Brietzke (eds.): Hamburgische Biografie-Personenlexikon, vol. 2, Wallstein Verlag, Hamburg, 2003, Sp. 204, Online
 Helmut Schoenfeld, Norbert Fischer, Barbara Leisner, Lutz Rehkopf: Der Ohlsdorfer Friedhof. Ein Handbuch von A–Z, Edition Temmen, Bremen, 2006, .

External links 
 Press Archive of the Ohlsdorf Cemetery

Footnotes 

House of Cirksena
People from Aurich (district)
Princesses of East Frisia
1657 births
1715 deaths
17th-century German people
Burials at the Ohlsdorf Cemetery